Parvocaecus is a genus of ground beetles in the family Carabidae. There are about five described species in Parvocaecus.

Species
These five species belong to the genus Parvocaecus:
 Parvocaecus anatolicus (Coiffait, 1956)  (Turkey)
 Parvocaecus assingi Giachino & Vailati, 2019  (Greece)
 Parvocaecus hetzeli Giachino & Vailati, 2019  (Greece)
 Parvocaecus perpusillus (Rottenberg, 1874)  (Greece)
 Parvocaecus turcicus (Coiffait, 1956)  (Turkey)

References

Trechinae